is a Japanese table tennis player.

Achievements

ITTF Tours
Men's singles

Men's doubles

Mixed doubles

References

1991 births
Living people
Japanese male table tennis players
Sportspeople from Kyoto
People from Maizuru
Aomori University alumni
Universiade medalists in table tennis
Universiade silver medalists for Japan
Universiade bronze medalists for Japan
Okayama Rivets players
Medalists at the 2011 Summer Universiade
Medalists at the 2013 Summer Universiade
Medalists at the 2015 Summer Universiade
Table tennis players at the 2018 Asian Games